Laurent Bernier (28 December 1921 – 13 August 2007) was a Canadian ski jumper who competed in the 1948 Winter Olympics.

References

1921 births
2007 deaths
Canadian male ski jumpers
Olympic ski jumpers of Canada
Ski jumpers at the 1948 Winter Olympics